Ciman may refer to:

 Laurent Ciman, a Belgian professional football player
 Çimən, a village in Azerbaijan 

See also:
Cimen (disambiguation)